Víctor Medina may refer to:
Víctor Medina (Mexican footballer), Mexican footballer and football manager
Víctor Medina (footballer, born 2001), Panamanian footballer
 Víctor Medina (pole vaulter), Colombian competitor at events such as the 2009 South American Championships in Athletics